Thomas James O'Neill (2 June 1882 – 16 October 1965) was a Liberal party member of the House of Commons of Canada. He was born in Winnipeg, Manitoba and became a locomotive engineer by career.

From 1897 to 1900, he was a member of the Rocky Mountain Rangers. O'Neill was active on various boards and committees, including chairing the British Columbia Railway Legislation Board at one time. He also served on the General Committee of Adjustment for Canadian Pacific Railway. He was an active supporter of labour unions, particularly the Brotherhood of Locomotive Engineers.

O'Neill was first elected to Parliament at the Kamloops riding in the 1935 general election then re-elected in 1940. He was defeated by Davie Fulton of the Progressive Conservative party in the 1945 election. O'Neill was also unsuccessful in unseating Fulton in 1949.

References

External links
 

1882 births
1965 deaths
Liberal Party of Canada MPs
Members of the House of Commons of Canada from British Columbia
Politicians from Winnipeg
Brotherhood of Locomotive Engineers and Trainmen people
Trade unionists from British Columbia
Trade unionists from Manitoba